The 2016–17 Scottish League Cup  (also known as the Betfred Cup for sponsorship reasons) was the 71st season of Scotland's second-most prestigious football knockout competition.

The format for the 2016–17 competition changed from the previously used knockout-rounds. Instead, it began with eight groups of five teams which included all 2015–16 Scottish Professional Football League (SPFL) clubs, excluding those competing in Champions League and Europa League qualifiers, as well as the winners of the 2015–16 Highland Football League (Cove Rangers) and the 2015–16 Lowland Football League (Edinburgh City).

Celtic won the final 3–0 against Aberdeen on 27 November 2016.

Schedule

Format
The competition began with eight groups of five teams. The four clubs competing in the UEFA Champions League (Celtic) and Europa League (Aberdeen, Heart of Midlothian and Hibernian) qualifying rounds were given a bye through to the second round. The 40 teams competing in the group stage consisted of the other nine teams that competed in the 2015–16 Scottish Premiership, nine from the 2015–16 Scottish Championship and all of the teams that competed in the 2015–16 Scottish League One and 2015–16 Scottish League Two, as well as the 2015–16 Highland Football League and the 2015–16 Lowland Football League champions.

The winners of each of the 8 groups, as well as the 4 best runners-up have progressed to the second round (last 16), which will include the four UEFA qualifying clubs. At this stage, the competition reverts to the traditional knock-out format. The four group winners with the highest points total and the clubs entering at this stage were seeded, with the four group winners with the lowest points unseeded along with the four best runners-up.

Bonus point system
In December 2015, the SPFL announced that alongside the new group stage format, a bonus point system would be introduced to provide greater excitement  and increase the number of meaningful games at this stage. The traditional point system of awarding 3 points for a win and 1 point for a draw was used, however, for each group stage match that finished in a draw, a penalty shoot-out took place, with the winner being awarded a bonus point.

Group stage

The group stage was made up of nine teams from the 2015–16 Scottish Premiership, nine teams from the 2015–16 Scottish Championship and 10 teams from each of the 2015–16 Scottish League One and 2015–16 Scottish League Two, as well as the winners of the 2015–16 Highland Football League and 2015–16 Lowland Football League. The 40 teams were divided into two sections: North and South; with each section containing four top seeded teams, four second seeded teams and 12 unseeded teams. Each section was drawn into four groups with each group being made up of 1 top seed, 1 second seed and 3 unseeded sides.

The draw for the group stages took place on Friday 27 May 2016 at 7:30pm BST at the BT Sport Studio in London and was shown live on BT Sport Europe.

North

Group A

Group B

Group C

Group D

South

Group E

Group F

Group G

Group H

Best runners-up

Knockout phase

Second round

Draw and seeding
The following teams qualified and will compete in the second round of the 2016–17 Scottish League Cup. Aberdeen, Celtic, Heart of Midlothian and Hibernian entered the competition at this stage, after receiving a bye for the group stage due to their participation in UEFA club competitions.

The draw for the second round took place at Tannadice Park following the conclusion of the Dundee United–Dunfermline Athletic match on 31 July, and was shown live on BT Sport. The four UEFA-qualifying clubs and the four group winners with the best record were seeded for the draw.

Teams in Bold advanced to the quarter-finals.

Notes
† denotes teams playing in the Championship.
* denotes team playing in League One.

Matches
All times are BST (UTC+1).

Quarter-finals

Draw and seeding
The quarter-final draw took place at Celtic Park following the conclusion of the Celtic–Motherwell match on 10 August, and was shown live on BT Sport. The draw was unseeded and ties scheduled for the midweek of 20/21 September.

Teams in Bold advanced to the semi-finals.

Matches

Semi-finals

Draw and seeding
The semi-final draw took place at Pittodrie Stadium following the conclusion of the Aberdeen–St Johnstone match on 22 September and was shown live on BT Sport. The draw was unseeded and ties are scheduled for the weekend of 22 October.

Teams in Bold advanced to the final.

Matches

Final

Top goalscorers

References

External links
 

Scottish League Cup seasons
League Cup
2016–17 in Scottish football cups